Neil Sedaka: All Time Greatest Hits, Volume 2 is a compilation album containing the works of American pop singer Neil Sedaka. The songs featured are some of Sedaka's lesser-known songs from his days with RCA Victor from 1958–1966, songs that were not included on the 1988 album Neil Sedaka: All Time Greatest Hits. The album was released in 1991 by RCA Records.

Tracks
 "The Diary" (alternate take) (recorded 10/27/1958)
 "I Go Ape" (1/15/1959)
 "Stupid Cupid" (4/1/1959)
 "The Same Old Fool" (October 1960)
 "Don't Lead Me On" (10/5/1961)
 "All The Words In The World" (2/9/1962)
 "Waiting For Never" (9/10/1962)
 "Look Inside Your Heart" (9/10/1962)
 "The Dreamer" (5/6/1963)
 "Bad Girl" (9/23/1963)
 "Wait 'Till You See My Baby" (9/23/1963)
 "The Closest Thing To Heaven" (February 1964)
 "Sunny" (5/25/1964)
 "I Hope He Breaks Your Heart" (9/30/1964)
 "Let The People Talk" (9/30/1964)
 "In The Chapel With You" (12/29/1964)
 "The World Through A Tear" (6/7/1965)
 "The Answer To My Prayer" (11/6/1965)
 "Blue Boy" (11/6/1965)
 "We Can Make It If We Try" (10/4/1966)
 "Station Announcements" (from a recording session with Al Nevins, 9/10/1962)

1991 compilation albums
Neil Sedaka compilation albums